The Dirt Road Diaries Tour was a headlining tour by American country music artist Luke Bryan, in support of his EP Spring Break…Here to Party and his fourth studio album Crash My Party (2013). It began on January 17, 2013 in Evansville, Indiana and finished on October 26, 2013 in West Palm Beach, Florida.

Background
In October 2012 the tour was announced. About the tour Bryan says, "I can feel the momentum. It has been an interesting process, and I'm so glad it didn't happen three or four years ago because I wouldn't have enjoyed it. I would be freaking out!" "I have dreamed about this day for a very long time. We are having the best time putting together all the bells and whistles for the tour. I have spent a lot of time out on tours with some reality great artists, and each night we have tried to learn from them. I couldn't be more excited about this!"

Opening acts
Thompson Square
Florida Georgia Line

Setlist
 
"Kiss Tomorrow Goodbye"
"Country Man"
"Someone Else Calling You Baby"
"Rain Is a Good Thing"
"Crash My Party"
"That's My Kind of Night"
"Muckalee Creek Water"
"Suntan City"
"If You Ain't Here to Party"
"One More Night" 
"Locked Out of Heaven" 
"Too Damn Young"
"Dirt Road Diary"
"Drink a Beer"
"Do I"
"The Only Way I Know"
"Drinkin' Beer and Wastin' Bullets"
"Drunk on You"
"Enter Sandman" /"All My Friends Say"
Encore
"I Don't Want This Night to End"
"Dynamite" 
"Country Girl (Shake It for Me)"

Tour dates

Box office score data

References

External links

2013 concert tours
Luke Bryan concert tours